Miikka Mujunen (born 14 August 1996) is a Finnish professional footballer who plays as a goalkeeper.

References

1996 births
Living people
Finnish footballers
FC Lahti players
FC Kuusysi players
Turun Palloseura footballers
Veikkausliiga players
Kakkonen players
Association football goalkeepers
Sportspeople from Lahti